JUDr. Ján Pivarník (born 13 November 1947, in Cejkov) is a former Slovak football player and later a football manager. He played for Czechoslovakia, for which he played 39 matches. 

He won the 1976 UEFA European Championship against Franz Beckenbauer`s West Germany.

He was member of the ALL STAR TEAM of 1976 UEFA European Championship and named as the best right defender in Europe.

At his time, he was the quickest football player in the World, making 100m in 10.9 sec.

He played mostly for Slovan Bratislava and later worked successfully as a coach for 25 years in Portugal, Austria, Saudi Arabia, Kuwait, Qatar, UAE and Oman.

Honours

As a Player
Slovan Bratislava
Slovak Cup (2): 1973–74, 1975–76
Czechoslovak First League (2): 1973–74, 1974–75
Czechoslovak Cup (1): 1973–74
Czechoslovakia
UEFA Euro 1976: Winner

As a Manager
Asian Cup Winners Cup (1):
1993 - 1994 - Al Qadisiyah Saudi
Kuwait Emir Cup (2):
1986 - 1999
Kuwaiti Premier League (1):
1997–98
Kuwait Crown Prince Cup (1):
1999
ALKHARAFI Cup (1):
1999
Saudi Federation Cup (1):
1993–94

References

External links 
 

1947 births
Living people
People from Trebišov District
Sportspeople from the Košice Region
Czechoslovak footballers
Slovak footballers
1970 FIFA World Cup players
UEFA Euro 1976 players
UEFA European Championship-winning players
FC VSS Košice players
ŠK Slovan Bratislava players
La Liga players
Cádiz CF players
Czechoslovakia international footballers
Czechoslovak football managers
Slovak football managers
Expatriate football managers in Kuwait
Al-Qadisiyah FC managers
Czechoslovak expatriate footballers
Expatriate footballers in Spain
Expatriate footballers in Austria
Czechoslovak expatriate sportspeople in Spain
Czechoslovak expatriate sportspeople in Austria
Association football defenders
FK Dukla Banská Bystrica players
Kuwait SC managers
Al-Arabi SC (Kuwait) managers
Al-Salmiya SC managers
Kuwait Premier League managers
Al-Fahaheel FC managers
Czechoslovak expatriate sportspeople in Kuwait
Czechoslovak expatriate sportspeople in Portugal
Czechoslovak expatriate sportspeople in Israel
Slovak expatriate sportspeople in Saudi Arabia
Expatriate sportspeople in Israel
Slovak expatriate sportspeople in Oman
SC Neusiedl am See 1919 managers
Hapoel Petah Tikva F.C. managers